Carmen Babiano Méndez-Núñez (1852–1914) was a Spanish painter and a pioneer in feminine art. 

She was born in Santiago de Compostela. At the Santiago Exhibition, 1875, she exhibited two oil paintings and two landscapes in crayon; at Corufia, 1878, a portrait in oil of the Marquis de Méndez Núñez; at Pontevedra, 1880, several pen and water-color studies, three life-size portraits in crayon, and a work in oil, "A Girl Feeding Chickens." She died in Pontevedra.

References

 

1852 births
1914 deaths
Painters from Galicia (Spain)
People from Santiago de Compostela
Spanish women artists
19th-century Spanish painters
20th-century Spanish painters
19th-century Spanish women artists
20th-century Spanish women artists